Jennifer Leigh Grubb (born July 20, 1978) is an American former women's soccer player.

Career
Grubb was the only WUSA player to participate in every minute of every game for her team. She was the number two pick in the 2001 WUSA Supplemental Draft. She played for the Washington Freedom from 2001 to 2006 and was inducted into the Hall of Freedom on July 24, 2010. In 2010, Grubb was a player-coach for Sky Blue FC in Women's Professional Soccer.

Statistics

International

International goals

Honors

International
United States
 Women's U.S. Cup: 1995
 Brazil Soccer Cup: 1996

References

External links

WUSA profile

1978 births
Living people
People from Elkhart, Indiana
Soccer players from Indiana
American soccer coaches
Parade High School All-Americans (girls' soccer)
Washington Freedom players
NJ/NY Gotham FC players
Women's association football defenders
American women's soccer players
United States women's international soccer players
United States women's under-20 international soccer players
Notre Dame Fighting Irish women's soccer players
University of Notre Dame alumni
Women's Professional Soccer players
Women's United Soccer Association players